Jovan Nikolić may refer to:

 Jovan Nikolić (footballer) (born 1991), Montenegrin footballer
 Jovan Nikolić (writer) (born 1955), Serbian Romani writer in Germany
 Jovan Nikolić (cartoonist) (born 1962), Serbian cartoonist
 Jovan Nikolić (priest) (died 2000s), Serbian-Orthodox priest in Croatia

See also
 Jovana Nikolić (born 1989), Serbian figure skater